The 1976 Society of West End Theatre Awards were held in December 1976, at the Café Royal in London. They were the first major award ceremony celebrating excellence in West End theatre from the Society of West End Theatre, which would change its name to the Society of London Theatre in 1984the same year the awards would be renamed the Laurence Olivier Awards.

Winners and nominees
Details of winners (in bold) and nominees, in each award category, per the Society of London Theatre.

{| class=wikitable style="width="100%"
|-
! width="50%" | Play of the Year
! width="50%" | Musical of the Year
|-
| valign="top" |
 Dear Daddy by Denis Cannan – Ambassadors
 For King and Country by John Wilson – Mermaid
 Funny Peculiar by Mike Stott – Garrick
 Old World by Aleksei Arbuzov, adapted by Ariadne Nicolaeff – RSC at the Aldwych
| valign="top" |
 A Chorus Line – Theatre Royal, Drury Lane
 Ipi Tombi – Her Majesty's
 Side by Side by Sondheim – Wyndham's
 Very Good Eddie – Piccadilly
|-
! colspan=1| Comedy of the Year
|-
|
 Donkeys' Years by Michael Frayn – Globe
 The Bed Before Yesterday by Ben Travers – Lyric
 Confusions by Alan Ayckbourn – Apollo
 Funny Peculiar by Mike Stott – Garrick
|-
! style="width="50%" | Actor of the Year in a New Play
! style="width="50%" | Actress of the Year in a New Play
|-
| valign="top" |
 Paul Copley as Private Hamp in For King and Country – Mermaid
 Richard Beckinsale as Trevor Tinsley in Funny Peculiar – Garrick
 Frank Finlay as Ben Prosser in Watch It Come Down and as Josef Frank in Weapons of Happiness – National Theatre
 Alec McCowen as Ben Musgrave in The Family Dance – Criterion
| valign="top" |
 Peggy Ashcroft as Lidya Vasilyevna in Old World – RSC at the Aldwych
 Pauline Collins as Belinda Trehern in Engaged – National Theatre
 Penelope Keith as Lady Driver in Donkeys' Years – Globe
 Joan Plowright as Alma in The Bed Before Yesterday – Lyric
|-
! style="width="50%" | Actor of the Year in a Revival
! style="width="50%" | Actress of the Year in a Revival
|-
| valign="top" |
 Alan Howard as Prince Hal/King Henry V in Henry IV and Henry V – RSC at the Aldwych
 Tom Conti as Don Juan in Don Juan and as Dick Dudgeon in The Devil's Disciple – RSC at the Aldwych
 Albert Finney as Prince Hamlet in Hamlet and as Tamburlaine in Tamburlaine the Great – National Theatre
 Emrys James as King Henry IV in Henry IV and as Chorus Henry V – RSC at the Aldwych| valign="top" |
 Dorothy Tutin as Natalya Petrovna in A Month in the Country – Albery Susan Fleetwood as Ophelia in Hamlet, as Zenocrate in Tamburlaine the Great and as Margaret Flaherty in The Playboy of the Western World – National Theatre
 Geraldine McEwan as Maria Wislack in On Approval – Theatre Royal Haymarket
 Googie Withers as Lady Chiltern in An Ideal Husband and as Madame Lyubov Andreievna Ranevskaya in The Cherry Orchard
|-
! colspan=1| Comedy Performance of the Year
|-
|
 Penelope Keith as Lady Driver in Donkeys' Years – Globe Peter Barkworth as Edward VIII in Crown Matrimonial – Theatre Royal Haymarket
 Richard Beckinsale as Trevor Tinsley in Funny Peculiar – Garrick
 Geraldine McEwan as Performer in Oh, Coward! – Criterion
|-
! colspan=1| Supporting Artist of the Year
|-
|
 Margaret Courtenay as Mrs Railton-Bell in Separate Tables – Apollo Bill Fraser as The Photographer in M. Perrichon's Travels, as Lord Porteous in The Circle, as Admiral Lord Radstock in The Fool and as Sir Toby Belch in Twelfth Night – Theatre Royal Haymarket
 Trevor Peacock as Ned Poins in Henry IV and as Sir Hugh Evans in The Merry Wives of Windsor – RSC at the Aldwych
 André van Gyseghem as Baron Tito Belcredi in Henry IV and as Polonius in Hamlet – RSC at the Aldwych
|-
! colspan=1| Director of the Year
|-
|
 Jonathan Miller for Three Sisters – Cambridge Alan Ayckbourn for Confusions, Shakespeare's People and Yahoo – Apollo
 Buzz Goodbody for King Lear and Occupations
 Terry Hands for Old World, Henry IV and Henry V – RSC at the Aldwych
|-
! colspan=1| Designer of the Year
|-
|
 Abd'Elkader Farrah for Henry IV and Henry V – RSC at the Aldwych Eileen Diss for The Family Dance – Criterion
 Ralph Koltai for Old World and Wild Oats – RSC at the Aldwych
 Alan Tagg for Confusions – Apollo, Donkeys' Years – Globe and Same Time, Next Year – Prince of Wales
|-
! colspan=1| Society Special Award
|-
|
 Save London's Theatres Campaign'|}

Productions with multiple nominations and awards
The following 12 productions received multiple nominations:

 6: Henry IV 5: Henry V 4: Donkeys' Years, Funny Peculiar and Old World 3: Confusions and Hamlet 2: For King and Country, Tamburlaine the Great, The Bed Before Yesterday and The Family DanceThe following three productions received multiple awards:

 2: Donkeys' Years, Henry IV and Henry V''

See also
 30th Tony Awards

References

External links
 Previous Olivier Winners – 1976

Laurence Olivier Awards ceremonies
Laurence Olivier Awards, 1976
1976 in London
December 1976 events in the United Kingdom
1976 awards in the United States